Reticulapex is a genus of air-breathing land snails, shell-less terrestrial pulmonate gastropod mollusks in the subfamily Trachycystinae of the family Charopidae.

Species 
Species in the genus Reticulapex include:
 Reticulapex apexfortis Emberton & Pearce, 2000
 Reticulapex choutardi (Fischer-Piette, C. P. Blanc, F. Blanc & F. Salvat, 1994)
 Reticulapex compactus Emberton & Pearce, 2000
 Reticulapex druggi (Fischer-Piette, C. P. Blanc, F. Blanc & F. Salvat, 1994)
 Reticulapex fischerpiettei Emberton & Pearce, 2000
 Reticulapex flammulatus Emberton & Pearce, 2000
 Reticulapex harananae (Emberton, 1994)
 Reticulapex intridi (Fischer-Piette, C. P. Blanc, F. Blanc & F. Salvat, 1994)
 Reticulapex lucidus Emberton & Pearce, 2000
 Reticulapex michellae K. C. Emberton, Slapcinsky, C. A. Campbell, Rakotondrazafy, Andriamiarison & J. D. Emberton, 2010
 Reticulapex scaber Emberton & Pearce, 2000
 Reticulapex stanisici Emberton & Griffiths, 2009
 Reticulapex subangulatus Emberton & Pearce, 2000
 Reticulapex talatai (Emberton, 1994)
 Reticulapex ulrichi (Fischer-Piette, C. P. Blanc, F. Blanc & F. Salvat, 1994)
 Reticulapex vatuvavyae (Emberton, 1994)
 Reticulapex villosus Emberton & Pearce, 2000
 Reticulapex vineti (Fischer-Piette, C. P. Blanc, F. Blanc & F. Salvat, 1994)

References
 
 Bank, R. A. (2017). Classification of the Recent terrestrial Gastropoda of the World. Last update: July 16th, 2017.
 Schileyko, A. A. (2001). Treatise on Recent terrestrial pulmonate molluscs. Part 7. Endodontidae, Thyrophorellidae, Charopidae. Ruthenica. Supplement 2: 881–1034.

External links
 Emberton, K.C. & Pearce, T.A. (2000). Charopid snails of Mounts Mahermana, Ilapiry, and Vasiha, southeastern Madagascar, with description of a new genus and with conservation statuses of nine species. The Veliger, 43: 248-264. Berkeley

Charopidae